The Navaminda Kasatriyadhiraj Royal Air Force Academy (NKRAFA) is a military academy for officer cadets of the Royal Thai Air Force.

History 

In 1950, the Royal Air Force (RTAF) started recruiting officers who completed their training from other institutions to work in the air force. Over time, as the number of military operations increased, the air force saw a need to build an air force academy to specifically train new cadets. In the same year, the Directorate of Education and Training of the RTAF proposed to the commander for the creation of such an academy and this was approved by the cabinet on 14 November 1952. The academy was officially opened on 7 May 1953 as the Royal Thai Air Force Academy, with the first intake of 30 cadets. The academy was then moved to its current location on 24 June 1963 near Don Muang Royal Thai Air Force Base. In 2013, King Bhumibol Adulyadej renamed the academy as the Navaminda Kasatriyadhiraj Royal Thai Air Force Academy, in commemoration of the academy's 60th year.

In 2017, Royal Thai Air Force proceeds to build a new Royal Air Force Academy at Muak Lek District, Saraburi Province with a budget of 5 billion baht due to the old location that is cramped. The new air force academy has its own airport to support the CT-4 training plane, able to connect with Wing 1 Nakhon Ratchasima, Wing 2 Lopburi and Wing 6 Don Mueang, as well as installing modern aviation equipment and technology to supports digital networking bypassing the environmental impact survey and comparative studies with leading international air academy overseas in order to produce quality military officers. The academy completed a construction in 2020 and open for teaching and learning for air cadet in 2023 onwards.

Curriculum 
 Bachelor of Engineering
 Electrical engineering
 Civil engineering
 Industrial engineering and Aviation management
 Mechanical engineering
 Aerospace engineering
 Bachelor of Science
 Computer science
 Military and Aerospace Materials

Air Force Cadet Regiment, King's Guard 
1st Cadet Battalion, Air Cadet Regiment, King's Guard, Navaminda Kasatriyadhiraj Royal Air Force Academy
2nd Cadet Battalion, Air Cadet Regiment, King's Guard, Navaminda Kasatriyadhiraj Royal Air Force Academy
3rd Cadet Battalion, Air Cadet Regiment, King's Guard, Navaminda Kasatriyadhiraj Royal Air Force Academy
4th Cadet Battalion, Air Cadet Regiment, King's Guard, Navaminda Kasatriyadhiraj Royal Air Force Academy
5th Cadet Battalion, Air Cadet Regiment, King's Guard, Navaminda Kasatriyadhiraj Royal Air Force Academy

See also 
 Chulachomklao Royal Military Academy
 Royal Thai Naval Academy
 Armed Forces Academies Preparatory School
 National Defence College of Thailand

References 

This article incorporates material from the corresponding article in the Thai Wikipedia.

Military academies of Thailand
Royal Thai Air Force
Sai Mai district
Educational institutions established in 1953
1953 establishments in Thailand
Institutes of higher education in Thailand